Richardson House may refer to:

in the United States
(by state)
 Richardson-Turner House, Lexa, Arkansas, listed on the NRHP in Arkansas
 Nathaniel Richardson House, Middlebury, Connecticut, listed on the NRHP in Connecticut
 Richardson House (Bradenton, Florida), listed on the NRHP in Florida
House at 7249 San Pedro, Jacksonville, Florida, also known as the Richardson House, NRHP-listed
 Richardson-Jakway House, Aurora, Iowa, listed on the NRHP in Iowa
 Richardson House (Brandenburg, Kentucky), listed on the NRHP in Kentucky
 Richardson House (Brunswick, Maine), listed on the NRHP in Maine
 John Richardson House (Barnstable, Massachusetts), NRHP-listed
 Fisher-Richardson House, Mansfield, Massachusetts, NRHP-listed
 Dexter Richardson House, Uxbridge, Massachusetts, NRHP-listed
 Joseph Richardson House (Uxbridge, Massachusetts), NRHP-listed
 Dr. S. O. Richardson House, Wakefield, Massachusetts, NRHP-listed
 Zachariah Richardson House, Winchester, Massachusetts, NRHP-listed
 Owen-Richardson-Owen House, Columbus, MS, listed on the NRHP in Mississippi
 Abijah Richardson, Sr. Homestead, Dublin, NH, listed on the NRHP in New Hampshire
 Deacon Abijah Richardson House, Dublin, NH, listed on the NRHP in New Hampshire
 John Richardson Homestead, Dublin, NH, listed on the NRHP in New Hampshire
 Luke Richardson House, Dublin, NH, listed on the NRHP in New Hampshire
 Thomas Richardson House, Ilion, NY, listed on the NRHP in New York
 John Richardson House (Lancaster, New York), property listed on the National Register of Historic Places in Erie County, New York
 Richardson-Bates House, Oswego, NY, listed on the NRHP in New York
 William Richardson House, Union Springs, NY, listed on the NRHP in New York
 Marshall-Harris-Richardson House, Raleigh, NC, listed on the NRHP in New York
 Richardson Houses Historic District, Reidsville, NC, listed on the NRHP in New York
Viets Hotel, Grand Forks, North Dakota, also known as Richardson House, NRHP-listed
 Richardson-Ulrich House, Klamath Falls, OR, listed on the NRHP in Oregon
 Joseph Richardson House (Langhorne, Pennsylvania), listed on the NRHP in Pennsylvania
 Asher and Mary Isabelle Richardson House, Asherton, TX, listed on the NRHP in Texas
 Jacob F. Richardson House, Park City, UT, listed on the NRHP in Utah
 Richardson-Jackson House, Spokane, WA, listed on the NRHP in Washington
 Richardson-Brinkman Cobblestone House, Clinton, WI, listed on the NRHP in Wisconsin
 Richardson Grout House, Evansville, WI, listed on the NRHP in Wisconsin
 Hamilton Richardson House, Janesville, WI, listed on the NRHP in Wisconsin
 Richardson's Overland Trail Ranch, Laramie, WY, listed on the NRHP in Wyoming

elsewhere
 Richardson House (Toronto hotel) was the first name of a hotel in Toronto, later named the Spadina Hotel

See also
John Richardson House (disambiguation)
Joseph Richardson House (disambiguation)